This is a list of properties and districts in Henry County, Georgia, that are listed on the National Register of Historic Places (NRHP).

Current listings

|}

References

Henry
Buildings and structures in Henry County, Georgia